The 30th Dáil was elected at the 2007 general election on 24 May 2007 and met on 14 June 2007. The members of Dáil Éireann, the house of representatives of the Oireachtas (legislature) of Ireland, are known as TDs. The 30th Dáil lasted  days, and saw a change of Taoiseach from Bertie Ahern to Brian Cowen. The 30th Dáil was dissolved by President Mary McAleese on 1 February 2011, at the request of the Taoiseach Brian Cowen.

Composition of the 30th Dáil

On 14 June 2007, Fianna Fáil, the Green Party and the Progressive Democrats, denoted with bullets, formed the 27th Government of Ireland, led by Bertie Ahern as Taoiseach. On 7 May 2008, after the resignation of Ahern, the parties formed the 28th Government of Ireland, led by Brian Cowen as Taoiseach.

Graphical representation
This is a graphical comparison of party strengths in the 30th Dáil in January 2011, shortly before its dissolution. This was not the official seating plan.

Ceann Comhairle
On 14 June 2007, John O'Donoghue (FF) was proposed by Bertie Ahern for the position of Ceann Comhairle. Ruairi Quinn (Lab) was proposed by Pat Rabbitte and seconded by Enda Kenny. O'Donoghue was approved by a vote of 90 to 75.

On 13 October 2009, O'Donoghue resigned as Ceann Comhairle. Séamus Kirk was proposed by Brian Cowen and seconded by Mary Coughlan. Dinny McGinley (FG) was proposed by Enda Kenny and seconded by Pádraic McCormack. Kirk was approved by a vote of 87 to 51.

Leadership
 Ceann Comhairle: 
 John O'Donoghue (Fianna Fáil), until 13 October 2009
 Séamus Kirk (Fianna Fáil), from 13 October 2009
 Leas-Cheann Comhairle: Brendan Howlin (Labour Party), from 26 June 2007

Government
 Taoiseach: 
 Bertie Ahern, until 7 May 2008
 Brian Cowen, from 7 May 2008
 Tánaiste:
 Brian Cowen, until 7 May 2008
 Mary Coughlan, from 7 May 2008
 Leader of Fianna Fáil:
 Bertie Ahern, until 7 May 2008
 Brian Cowen, until 22 January 2011
 Micheál Martin, from 26 January 2011
 Leader of the Green Party:
 Trevor Sargent, until 17 July 2007
 John Gormley, from 17 July 2007 (Left government on 23 January 2011)
 Leader of the Progressive Democrats:
 Mary Harney, until 17 April 2008
 Ciarán Cannon, until 24 March 2009
 Noel Grealish, from 24 March 2009 to 20 November 2009

Opposition
 Leader of the Opposition and Leader of Fine Gael: Enda Kenny 
 Leader of the Labour Party: 
 Pat Rabbitte, until 6 September 2007
 Eamon Gilmore, from 6 September 2007
 Leader of the Technical Group: Caoimhghín Ó Caoláin (Sinn Féin), from 10 December 2010

List of TDs 
This is a list of TDs elected to Dáil Éireann in the 2007 general election, sorted by party. The Changes table below records all changes in party affiliation.

Changes

See also
Members of the 23rd Seanad

References

Further reading

External links
Houses of the Oireachtas: Debates: 30th Dáil

 
30th Dáil
30